The sixth season of Mad TV, an American sketch comedy series, originally aired in the United States on the Fox Network between September 23, 2000, and June 23, 2001.

Summary 
Mad TV began its 6th season with several cast changes. Pat Kilbane and original cast member Phil LaMarr left the show at the end of the 5th season. Returning repertory players Alex Borstein, Mo Collins, Michael McDonald, Will Sasso, Aries Spears, Nicole Sullivan, and Debra Wilson were joined by Nelson Ascencio (a featured player from last season) and newcomer Christian Duguay.  Andrew Daly, Dannah Feinglass, Jeff Richards, and Stephnie Weir were added as featured players.

Cast members reprised many of their well-known characters and schticks. Alex Borstein and Will Sasso interviewed celebrities at red-carpet events, while Sasso performed celebrity impersonations of Robert De Niro and Fred Durst of Limp Bizkit. Mo Collins appeared as Doreen Larkin, Trina Moss, Lorraine Swanson, and Liz Whitman-Goldfarb. Debra Wilson and Aries Spears appeared frequently as Whitney Houston and Bobby Brown.

The cast also added several new characters. Michael McDonald portrayed the Depressed Persian Tow Truck Man (later named Mofaz), an irritable American immigrant who uses pop culture references to illustrate his and his family's shortcomings. Stephnie Weir played Dot Goddard, a 7-year-old girl whose intelligence pales next to her twin sister, Karen (Alex Borstein), a child genius who has written several books, found cures for diseases and planned NASA expeditions. Michael McDonald and Mo Collins played Dot's parents, who treasure Karen but despise and often shun and abuse Dot. Stephnie Weir also unveiled the characters Mrs. Campbell, a curious old lady, and Dr. Kylie, an immature, party-loving doctor. Season 5 guests Seth Green and Susan Sarandon returned periodically during season 6.

Christian Duguay impersonated Jay Leno, President George W. Bush, and NSYNC member Joey Fatone. Duguay also played hyperactive preteen Edward and Loopgarue of "Loopgarue & Hulahoop," with Mo Collins as Hulahoop.

At the end of season six, another original cast member (Nicole Sullivan) left while Nelson Ascencio and Dannah Feinglass were fired. Jeff Richards famously left in the middle of season six and was hired as a cast member on Mad TVs rival show, Saturday Night Live (becoming one of only two cast members to do so) and stayed on SNL for two and a half years.

This season also had five additional episodes created in the event that a Writers Guild of America strike would halt production. These episodes ended up being extra episodes for season seven.

Opening montage 
The Mad TV logo appears and the theme song begins. Each member of the repertory cast, followed by the featured cast, is introduced alphabetically. The screen is divided into three live-action clips of each cast member performing recurring characters and celebrity impersonations during the introductions. When the last featured cast member is introduced, the music stops and the title sequence ends with the phrase "You are now watching Mad TV."

Cast

Repertory cast members
 Nelson Ascencio  (30/30 episodes) 
 Alex Borstein  (30/30 episodes) 
 Mo Collins  (30/30 episodes) 
 Christian Duguay  (23/30 episodes) 
 Michael McDonald  (30/30 episodes) 
 Will Sasso  (30/30 episodes) 
 Aries Spears  (30/30 episodes) 
 Nicole Sullivan  (23/30 episodes) 
 Debra Wilson  (30/30 episodes) 

Featured cast members
 Andrew Daly  (16/30 episodes) 
 Dannah Feinglass  (6/30 episodes) 
 Jeff Richards  (4/30 episodes) 
 Stephnie Weir  (19/30 episodes)

Writers

Bryan Adams (eps. 1–30)
Tom Agna (eps. 21–30)
Dick Blasucci (eps. 1–30)
Alex Borstein (eps. 7, 9, 12, 30)
Jeff Bushnell (eps. 1–5, 7)
Garry Campbell (writing supervisor) (eps. 1–30)
Xavier Cook (eps. 1–30)
Steven Cragg (eps. 1–30)
John Crane (eps. 21–30)
Lauren Dombrowski (eps. 1–30)
Christian Duguay (ep. 12)
Brian Hartt (eps. 3, 13) (both Season 05 Encore)
Michael Hitchcock (eps. 1–30)
Jennifer Joyce (eps. 1–30)
Scott King (eps. 11–30)
Michael Koman (eps. 1–30)
Lanier Laney (eps. 20, 22, 30) (All Encore)
Bruce McCoy (eps. 1–30)
Michael McDonald (eps. 1, 2, 5–9, 11, 13, 14, 16–18, 23–25, 28, 29)
J.J. Philbin (eps. 1–30)
Will Sasso (ep. 23)
Devon Shepard (eps. 1–30)
Bob Smith (ep. 14) (Season 05 Encore)
Emily Spivey (eps. 1–12, 14, 29) (14, 29: both Season 05 Encore)
Nicole Sullivan (eps. 28, 30)
Terry Sweeney (eps. 20, 22, 30) (All Encore)
Stephnie Weir (eps. 8, 14, 17, 23)

Episodes

Home Release
This season is included on the streaming service HBO Max, with episodes 1, 2, 3, 4, 5, 6, 7, 8, 10, 12, 13, 14, 16, 17, 18, 22, 23, 24, and 26 missing.

External links 
 Mad TV - Official Website
 

06
2000 American television seasons
2001 American television seasons